Ameryka , formerly Pagłowo is a village in the administrative district of Gmina Olsztynek, within Olsztyn County, Warmian-Masurian Voivodeship, in northern Poland.

The village has a population of 100.

It is the site of a children's rehabilitation hospital.

References

Villages in Olsztyn County